Enigmocarnus is a genus of flies (Diptera). There is 1 described species.

Species
E. chloropiformis Buck, 2007

References

Carnidae
Carnoidea genera
Monotypic Brachycera genera